Meg Kilcoyne is an American politician in  Massachusetts representing 12th Worcester district in the Massachusetts House of Representatives.

Early life and education 
Kilcoyne grew up in Sterling, Massachusetts and went to Chocksett and Houghton schools, she graduated from Wachusett Regional High School and Stonehill College with a B.A. in History.

Political career 
Kilcoyne first won election in 2020 defeating Republican Susan E. Smiley, succeeding fellow Democrat Harold Naughton Jr., who she worked for since 2012. She is the first woman elected to the 12th Worcester district. 
Kilcoyne won a 3 way democratic primary in 2020

See also
 2021–2022 Massachusetts legislature

References 

Democratic Party members of the Massachusetts House of Representatives
People from Northborough, Massachusetts
Stonehill College alumni
Year of birth missing (living people)
Living people
Women state legislators in Massachusetts